Henriette Ivanans (born October 29, 1968) is a Canadian actress and writer.

Early life and education 
Ivanans is of Latvian and Danish heritage; her father is from Riga, and her mother is from Copenhagen. She is a graduate of Ryerson Theatre School in Toronto.

Career 
Ivanans appeared for two seasons on the hit CBC series Liberty Street as well as making many notable theatre performances in Toronto including the Shaw Festival in Niagara-on-the-Lake, Ontario. After many years in Canadian and American television work, she moved to Los Angeles and continues to work in television and film, most recently in JAG, Strong Medicine, Star Trek: Voyager and the film Smother, which stars Diane Keaton, Liv Tyler, and Dax Shepard.

She is the author of In Pillness and in Health, a memoir about her recovery from drugs and alcohol during her kidney transplant where her husband was the donor.

Filmography

Film

Television

References

External links
 https://www.henrietteivanans.com Official website

Henriette Ivanans Resume at ActorsAccess.com

Canadian television actresses
Canadian film actresses
Living people
1968 births
Canadian stage actresses
Canadian people of Latvian descent
Canadian people of Danish descent
20th-century Canadian actresses
21st-century Canadian actresses
Actresses from Toronto